Desnuda en la arena is a 1969 Argentine comedy film written and directed by Armando Bó. It stars sexploitation icon Isabel Sarli and comedian Jorge Porcel.

Plot

The well known star of erotic movies, Isabel Sarli, plays Alicia a single mother who moves to Panama and starts working as a stripper deceiving men and making them the victims of her extortions.

Cast
Isabel Sarli
Jorge Porcel
Víctor Bó
Mónica Grey
Virginia Romay
Eduardo Frangías
Raúl del Valle
Reynaldo Mompel

References

External links
 

1969 films
Argentine comedy films
1960s Spanish-language films
Films directed by Armando Bó
1960s Argentine films